Pacific high may refer to:

A meteorological term referring to a semi-permanent, subtropical anticyclone:
North Pacific High
South Pacific High
Pacific High School (disambiguation)